Horipsestis angusta is a moth in the family Drepanidae. It is found in Thailand.

References

Moths described in 1996
Thyatirinae